Badr al-Din Baydara al-Mansuri was the na'ib al-saltana (viceroy) of the Mamluk sultan al-Ashraf Khalil

Early life
Baydara was a toddler or younger when he arrived in Cairo with his mother as captives from the Battle of Ain Jalut in 1260.

Career
Baydara was appointed the governor of Upper Egypt, excluding the Fayyum oasis, in 1281 by Sultan Qalawun.

References

Bibliography

14th-century viceregal rulers
Mamluk emirs
Bahri dynasty